The Ecomuseo della Montagna Pistoiese (Ecomuseum of the Pistoian Mountain Region) is a partly open-air museum, located in the mountainous part of the Province of Pistoia, Tuscany, Italy. It covers a variety of thematic areas, from proto-industrial activities to daily life, at a number of sites. The unifying focus is on ecology, or more precisely the integration of humanity into nature.

History
Founded in 1990, the ecomuseum consists of a coordinated assemblage of open-air itineraries with museums and teaching centers, within the Pistoian Mountain Region of the Northern Apennines. Currently there are six itineraries, each with its own museum and related teaching materials. The administrative center of the museum is in the historic Palazzo Achilli at Gavinana, in San Marcello Pistoiese; it is equipped with interactive learning laboratories, the Central Information Point, reception facilities, and audio and visual archives on the traditions of the region.

Itineraries

Ice Itinerary - Ice was formerly produced in ice houses, to be sold in the cities in the summer months and also for supply to hospital facilities 
Iron Itinerary - The energy of moving water was used to work iron 
Sacred Art and Popular Religion Itinerary
Everyday Life Itinerary
Nature Itinerary
Stone Itinerary

See also
 Open-air museum
 Ecomuseum

External links 
 Official website
 Ecomuseo della Montagna Pistoiese at Agenzia per il Turismo Abetone Pistoia Montagna Pistoiese

Buildings and structures in Pistoia
Museums in Tuscany
Open-air museums in Italy